Gastão Elias was the defending champion, but lost in the final to Máximo González, 7–5, 6–3.

Seeds

Draw

Finals

Top half

Bottom half

References
 Main Draw
 Qualifying Draw

Campeonato Internacional de Tenis de Santos - Singles
2014 Singles